Carden may refer to:

Places
Carden, Cheshire, a village in Cheshire, England
Carden, United States Virgin Islands, a settlement on the island of Saint Croix
Carden, Ontario

Other uses
Carden (surname)
Carden Aero Engines, a British aircraft engine manufacturer
Carden (cyclecar), a British 4 wheeled cyclecar made from 1914 by Carden Engineering
Carden Hall
Carden Loyd tankette, a series of British pre-World War II tankettes
Carden Method, an educational system founded by Mae Carden

See also
 Cardan (disambiguation)
Carden House (disambiguation)